.il is the Internet country code top-level domain (ccTLD) of Israel, administered by the Israel Internet Association and managed by NIC - ISRAEL, which hosts the DNS root server and manages the Israeli Internet Exchange, that supports IPv4 and IPv6.

The .il top-level domain is one of the earliest registered ccTLDs. When Israel registered it, on 24 October 1985, it was the third registration of any ccTLD, after .us and .uk, which were registered earlier that year.

As of 10 June 2014 there are 227,066 domain names registered under the .il ccTLD in Israel.

Top-level domains in Hebrew script
On 19 May 2020, ICANN approved the use of the  ישראל.‎ domain, that was proposed in 2012. It was delegated on 11 February 2021, and since 22 November 2022 it is possible to register domain names in full Hebrew script.

Unlike the structure of .il, domain names registered under ישראל. may be either directly at second-level (for example: איגוד-האינטרנט.ישראל) or at third-level under one of these second-level domains:

 אקדמיה.ישראל.: Academic institutions; equivalent to .ac.il.
 ממשל.ישראל.: Government and Governmental System; equivalent to .gov.il.
 צהל.ישראל.: Israel Defense Forces; equivalent to .idf.il.
 ישוב.ישראל.: Municipal Government; equivalent to .muni.il.

There will not be a Hebrew-script equivalent to these second-level domains:

 .co.il
 .org.il
 .k12.il
 .net.il

As a more private initiative the top-level domain  ("com") was registered by VeriSign in 2016. It has as of 2020 many thousand second-level domains, mostly in Hebrew script, some in Latin script.

Second-level domains

Domain names ending with .il will always be in the third level under one of these second-level domains:

 .ac.il: Academic Institutions; administration delegated to the Inter-University Computation Center.
 .co.il: Commercial Entities; administration delegated to five private registrars.
 .org.il: Non-commercial Organizations; administration delegated to five private registrars.
 .net.il: Israeli Internet service providers; available only to licensed providers by the Israel Internet Association.
 .k12.il: Schools and Kindergartens
 .gov.il: Government and Governmental System; administration delegated to Ministry of Finance.
 .muni.il: Municipal Government
 .idf.il: Israel Defense Forces; administration delegated to the army's Center of Computing and Information Systems.

Registration of other second-level domain names directly under .il is not supported.

Hebrew third level domains such as איגוד-האינטרנט.org.il are available since 2010.

See also 
 Country code top-level domain

References

External links
 IANA .il whois information
 Israeli Internet Association – 
 Israeli Internet Association – official site of the .il ccTLD (English version)
 Israel Network Information Center

Computer-related introductions in 1985
Council of European National Top Level Domain Registries members
Country code top-level domains
Internet in Israel

sv:Toppdomän#I